This is a list of songs which received the most airplay per week on radio stations in the United States as ranked and published by Billboard magazine on the Radio Songs chart (previously named Hot 100 Airplay) during the 2010s.

Number-one airplay hits

Statistics

Artists by total number-one songs
The following artists achieved three or more number-one songs during the 2010s. A number of artists had number-one singles on their own as well as part of a collaboration.

Artists by total cumulative weeks at number one

The following artists were featured at the top of the Hot 100 for the highest cumulative number of weeks during the 2010s (as of October 27, 2018). Some totals include in part or in whole weeks spent at number one as part of a collaboration. An asterisk (*) denotes that an artist is currently at number one.

Songs by total number of weeks at number one

The following songs were featured at the top of Radio Songs for the highest number of weeks during the 2010s.

"Circles" spent 6 consecutive weeks at #1 starting in December 2019, then returned to the top spot for an additional 5 consecutive weeks in February 2020.

See also
 2010s in music
 List of Hot 100 number-one singles of the 2010s (U.S.)
 Digital Songs
 Streaming Songs
 On-Demand Songs

References

United States Radio Songs
Billboard charts
Lists of number-one songs in the United States
2010s in American music